John Gordon (11 April 1899 – 11 April 1964) was a Scottish footballer who played as an inside-right for Queen's Park, Port Vale, Greenock Morton, Luton Town, and Dunfermline Athletic.

Career
Gordon played for Queen's Park, before joining Port Vale of the Second Division in August 1922. He scored his first goal at The Old Recreation Ground on 4 September, in a 1–0 win over Hull City. He went on to find the net in home wins over Clapton Orient and Bury. He was a first team regular until falling out of favour in December 1922. After 24 league and cup appearances, he was released at the end of 1922–23 season. He later played for Greenock Morton, Luton Town and Dunfermline Athletic.

Career statistics
Source:

References

People from Kirkcudbright
Footballers from Dumfries and Galloway
Scottish footballers
Association football inside forwards
Petershill F.C. players
Queen's Park F.C. players
Port Vale F.C. players
Greenock Morton F.C. players
Luton Town F.C. players
Dunfermline Athletic F.C. players
Scottish Football League players
English Football League players
1899 births
1964 deaths